When Your Lights Are Out is an unplugged acoustic album released in 2006 by New Zealand band Hello Sailor, which features reworked versions of many of their biggest hits and most popular songs. The album reached number 33 on the New Zealand music charts.

Track listing

References

Hello Sailor (band) albums
2006 albums